Grove Park Historic District is a national historic district located at Asheville, Buncombe County, North Carolina.  The district encompasses 290 contributing buildings and 1 contributing site in a predominantly residential section Asheville. The planned suburban community was originally platted and developed in 1908-1913 and 1914. It includes representative examples of Colonial Revival, Tudor Revival, and Bungalow style dwellings.  The community was laid out by noted landscape architect Chauncey Beadle.  The Kimberly Amendment to Grove Park was an expansion made to the original Grove Park development in 1923.  It includes the former Asheville Country Club, now the Grove Park Inn Country Club.

It was listed on the National Register of Historic Places in 1989, with a boundary increase in 1990.

Gallery

References

Houses on the National Register of Historic Places in North Carolina
Historic districts on the National Register of Historic Places in North Carolina
Tudor Revival architecture in North Carolina
Colonial Revival architecture in North Carolina
Buildings and structures in Asheville, North Carolina
National Register of Historic Places in Buncombe County, North Carolina
Houses in Buncombe County, North Carolina